Mating rituals may refer to:
Mating, procreative behavior in animals
Courtship display, animal behaviors involving mating rituals